Oregon Public Schools is a school district in Northwest Ohio. The school district serves students who live in the cities of Oregon, Curtice, and Jerusalem Twp. in Lucas County. The superintendent is Hal Gregory.

Grades 9-12
Clay High School

Grades 5-8
Fassett Junior High
Eisenhower Intermediate School

Grades K-4
Coy Elementary
Starr Elementary
Jerusalem Elementary
Wynn Elementary

Parochial Schools within the District
 Cardinal Stritch Catholic High School (Co-ed Catholic School educating grades 9-12)
 Kateri Catholic Schools (Co-ed Pre-K through 8th Grade) Located on the campus of Cardinal Stritch High School

External links
District Website

School districts in Ohio
Education in Lucas County, Ohio
School districts established in 1850